The discography of American heavy metal band Metallica includes eleven studio albums, eight live albums, three extended plays, 44 singles, ten video albums, 43 music videos, one soundtrack album, one collaboration album and three box sets. They are a San Francisco-based metal band formed in 1981 by James Hetfield (lead vocals, rhythm guitar) and Lars Ulrich (drums). After several bassist and lead guitarist changes (including Dave Mustaine), the band settled on Cliff Burton and Kirk Hammett, respectively. Metallica started playing locally, releasing their first widely circulated demo, No Life 'til Leather, in 1982. The demo caught the attention of Johny Zazula, who signed Metallica to Megaforce Records. The band released Kill 'Em All in 1983, and the following year they released Ride the Lightning. After Ride the Lightning was released, Metallica left Megaforce and signed to Elektra Records. In March 1986, the band released its third studio album, Master of Puppets, which was Metallica's first album to be certified gold by the Recording Industry Association of America (RIAA). While promoting the album, Burton was killed in a bus accident. Jason Newsted was hired as a replacement. The band's first release to feature Newsted was The $5.98 E.P. – Garage Days Re-Revisited, and then followed by ...And Justice for All in August 1988, which peaked at number six on the Billboard 200.

Metallica's fifth, self-titled album, often called The Black Album, was released in 1991 and debuted at number one on the Billboard 200. The band embarked on a two-year tour in support of the album. Metallica has since been certified 16 times platinum by the RIAA. Metallica followed with the release of Load and Reload, respectively. After the release of Garage Inc. and S&M, Newsted (who would later join Voivod) departed from the band. Metallica recorded St. Anger without an official bassist (bass parts for the writing & recording during the album sessions were played by the band's long-time producer Bob Rock). Bassist Robert Trujillo joined Metallica in 2003. In 2008, the band released its ninth studio album, Death Magnetic, which was produced by Rick Rubin and distributed through Warner Bros. Records. In April 2009, the band's catalogue was released on the iTunes Store as the Metallica Collection.

In 2013, Metallica released the movie Metallica: Through the Never, together with its soundtrack. Metallica then started writing their tenth studio album, Hardwired... to Self-Destruct, which was released on November 18, 2016. Metallica has sold more than 125 million albums worldwide, with over 67 million records in the United States alone (56.3 million albums since 1991 when SoundScan started tracking actual sales figures).

Albums

Studio albums

Live albums

Cover albums

Tribute albums

Collaboration albums

Soundtrack albums

Extended plays

Box sets

Singles

Promotional singles

Other charted songs

Other appearances

Guest appearances

Videos

Video albums

Music videos

See also
 List of Metallica demos
 List of songs recorded by Metallica

Notes

References

External links
 
 Metallica at AllMusic
 

Heavy metal group discographies
Discography
Discographies of American artists